KeyKOS is a persistent, pure capability-based operating system for the IBM S/370 mainframe computers. It allows emulating the environments of VM, MVS, and Portable Operating System Interface (POSIX). It is a predecessor of the Extremely Reliable Operating System (EROS), and its successor operating systems, CapROS, and Coyotos. KeyKOS is a nanokernel-based operating system.

In the mid-1970s, development of KeyKOS began at Tymshare, Inc., under the name GNOSIS. In 1984, McDonnell Douglas (MD) bought Tymshare. A year later MD spun off Key Logic, which bought GNOSIS and renamed it KeyKOS.

References

External links 
 , Norman Hardy
 GNOSIS: A Prototype Operating System for the 1990s, a 1979 paper, Tymshare Inc.
 KeyKOS - A Secure, High-Performance Environment for S/370, a 1988 paper, Key Logic, Inc.

Nanokernels
Capability systems
Microkernel-based operating systems